The Inhaca fringelip (Cirrhimuraena inhacae) is an eel in the family Ophichthidae (worm/snake eels). It was described by J.L.B. Smith in 1962. It is a marine, tropical eel which is known from the western Indian Ocean, including Inhaca Island, Mozambique and Madagascar.

References

Ophichthidae
Fish described in 1962